The Chelmsford Chieftains are an Ice Hockey team based in Chelmsford, Essex that are currently playing in the NIHL South Division 1. Since the team was founded in 1987, the Chieftains have played their home games at the Riverside Ice and Leisure Centre.

Chelmsford's first ever game at the Riverside Ice and Leisure Centre was a challenge match against Peterborough Titans on Saturday 5 September 1987. The Chieftains won the game 11-4 in front of 300 spectators. Stuart Steeves (Chelmsford) scored the first ever goal at the venue at 2.07 in the first period.

After competing in the English Premier Ice Hockey League for eight seasons between 1998 and 2008 (having been absent from the league from 2000 until 2002), the Chelmsford Chieftains withdrew from the league at the end of the 2007/2008 season, and instead entered the English National Ice Hockey League. The hockey governing body in the UK, the EIHA, informed the club that they would be playing in Division 1 for the 2008/2009 season. However, at the league A.G.M., many of the clubs supported a motion to overturn the league's decision and the Chieftains were placed in Division 2. The Chieftains had already assembled a squad capable of playing in Division 1 and at such a late stage, the squad could not be rebuilt. The outcome was that the Chieftains started the season in a very strong position.

In the entire 2008/2009 season, the Chieftains allowed a single point, to the Invicta Mustangs at the start of the season. From then until the end of the season, the Chieftains won every game, with an average score of 8-2.

In 2009/10, they finished fourth in the league.

In the 2010/11 season, the Chieftains contended for top spot. Only in the final few weeks did the Wightlink Raiders cement their place at the top of the table. The Raiders had been the only side the Chieftains had failed to beat during the regular season.

At the conclusion of the 2010/11 season, Dean Birrell announced he would be moving to the role of Director of Coaching in Chelmsford, which would oversee the coaching of the Chieftains and Warriors. Taking his place would be MK Lightning forward Gary Clarke, who takes over in a player-coach role for the 2011-12 campaign.

Trophies

1989 Essex Cup
1990/91 Autumn Trophy
1992/93 British League Entry Playoffs
1996/97 Essex/Kent Cup
1996/97 Essex Cup
1999/00 English League Premier Division Playoffs
1999/00 Data Vision Millenium Cup
1999/00 English League Premier Division 
2008/09 English National League South Division 2
2010/11 English National League South Division 1 Playoffs
2011/12 English National League South Division 1 Playoffs
2011/12 Essex Cup
2012/13 National Ice Hockey League South Division 1
2012/13 National Ice Hockey League South Division 1 Playoffs
2013/14 National Ice Hockey League South Division 1
2014/15 National Ice Hockey League South Division 1
2018/19 National Ice Hockey League South Division 2

Runners up in major competitions excluding league
1996/97 Playoff finalists
1997/98 Playoff finalists
1995/96 Autumn Trophy Finalists
2010/11 English National League South Division 1
2011/12 English National League South Division 1
2012/13 National Ice Hockey League South Cup
2012/13 South East Cup

2017/18 National Ice Hockey League South Division 2

League history

Club roster 2022-23
(*) Denotes a Non-British Trained player (Import)

2021/22 Outgoing

References

Ice hockey teams in England
Sport in Chelmsford
Sports clubs in Essex